The 2017 Island Games in Gotland is the fifteenth edition in which an association football tournament was played at the multi-games competition and the ninth Women's tournament. 

Women's Football at the 2017 Island Games forms part of the Football at the 2017 Island Games event.

Participants

 Isle of Man

Venues

Group Phase

Group A

Group B

Group C

Placement play-off matches

9th place match

7th place match

5th place match

Final stage

Bracket

Semi-finals

Third place match

Final

Final rankings

See also
Men's Football at the 2017 Island Games

References

Football at the 2017 Island Games
2017
Island